The Battle of Villepion was a battle between the French XVI Corps under General Chanzy and the I Bavarian Corps during the Franco-Prussian War. It occurred in the district of Terminiers, between Terminiers and Nonneville on 1 December 1870, and ended in a French victory.

After the Battle of Beaune-la-Rolande on 28 November 1870 the Corps in the centre of the French Army of the Loire advanced and made a swing east towards Pithiviers. On the early afternoon of 1 December an infantry division and a cavalry division of the French XVI Corps met I. Bayerischen Korps. The battle began in Terminiers and the western districts of the town. Although the whole I Corps intervened in the battle, the Bavarians held the position and the Corps had to retreat towards Villepion.

The fighting here lasted until nightfall. Under the cover of darkness the Bavarians retreated then returned and reunited with other units of the army group under Frederick Francis II, Grand Duke of Mecklenburg-Schwerin at Goury and Villeprivost (Loigny la Bataille). The retreat was covered by an artillery battery under the command of captain (later field marshal) Leopold of Bavaria, wounded in the action and receiving the Military Order of Max Joseph for his conduct in the battle, the highest Bavarian award for valour in the face of the enemy. The Bavarians lost 42 officers and about 1,000 men, while the French losses are not accurately documented. The German army group's counter-attack the next day led to the battle of Loigny-Poupry.

External links 
 History of the Franco Prussian War.
  Leopold, in: Meyers Konversationslexikon, Vol 18. p 579 f
 Article in the North Otago Times

Battle of Villepion
Conflicts in 1870
Battles of the Franco-Prussian War
Battles involving Prussia
Villepion
History of Eure-et-Loir
December 1870 events